Lucy Gérard (2 June 1872 – 20 November 1941), born Marie-Louise Philiberte Lucy Gérard, was a French actress on stage and in silent films; in her later career she was billed as Lucy Mareil.

Early life 
Lucy Gérard was born in Lyon, France, on 2 June 1872. She studied with François Jules Edmond Got at the Paris Conservatoire.

Career 

Gérard began acting in her teens, with her Paris debut in 1888, in the opera Isoline. She was active on the Paris stage, including a role in La Montagne Enchantée (1897) with Jane Hading. She was a popular subject of souvenir postcards, cigarette cards, and cabinet cards, and Italian artist Giovanni Boldini made a pastel portrait of her.

As "Lucy Mareil", she appeared in at least a dozen French silent films, including Blessure d'amour (1916), C'est pour les orphelins! (1917), Les leçons de chant de Rigadin (1918), Madame et son filleul (1919), Chouquette et son as (1919), Les cinqs gentlemen maudits (1920), L'empereur des pauvres (1921), La flamme (1922), and Petit Ange et son pantin (1923).

Personal life 
Lucy Gérard died in Paris in 1941, aged 69 years.

References

External links 

 
 

1872 births
1941 deaths
French stage actresses
Conservatoire de Paris alumni
Actresses from Lyon
French silent film actresses
20th-century French actresses